Sarah Catherine Sharples (born 1972) is a British academic specialising in human factors and ergonomics. She has been Professor of Human Factors at the University of Nottingham since 2012 and chief scientific adviser for the Department for Transport since 2021. She has spent all her academic career at the University of Nottingham, and was also its pro-vice-chancellor for equality, diversity and inclusion  from 2018 to 2021.

Having been educated at Wimbledon High School, an all-girls private school in London, she studied psychology, human factors, and engineering at the University of Nottingham (BSc, MSc, PhD). Her doctoral thesis was titled "Virtual Reality Induced Symptoms and Effects (VRISE): methodological and the theoretical issues".

References

1972 births
Living people
Academics of the University of Nottingham
People educated at Wimbledon High School
Alumni of the University of Nottingham